Waldir Peres de Arruda (January 2, 1951 – July 23, 2017), known as Waldir Peres, was a Brazilian footballer who played as a goalkeeper, in particular with São Paulo and the Brazil national team.

Playing career

Club
At club level, Peres was mainly known for his time with São Paulo.

International
At international level, Peres was capped 30 times for Brazil, between October 1975 and July 1982; he was a member of the Brazil national team at the World Cup 1974, 1978 and 1982. He played five games at the 1982 World Cup.

Coaching career
In 2006, Peres was appointed as the Vitória-ES U-18 team manager during the Copa São Paulo de Juniores.

Death
Peres died in 2017 of a heart attack; he was 66.

Personal life
Peres's daughter Erika Peres was also a footballer.

Honours

Club
São Paulo
Campeonato Brasileiro Série A: 1977 
Campeonato Paulista (São Paulo State championship): 1975, 1978, 1980, 1981

Santa Cruz
Campeonato Pernambucano: 1990

Individual
Brazilian Golden Ball: 1975
Brazilian Silver Ball: 1975

References

1951 births
2017 deaths
People from Garça
Brazilian people of Spanish descent
Brazilian footballers
Association football goalkeepers
Campeonato Brasileiro Série A players
1974 FIFA World Cup players
1975 Copa América players
1978 FIFA World Cup players
1982 FIFA World Cup players
Brazil international footballers
Brazilian football managers
Associação Atlética Ponte Preta players
São Paulo FC players
America Football Club (RJ) players
Guarani FC players
Sport Club Corinthians Paulista players
Santa Cruz Futebol Clube players
Esporte Clube São Bento managers
Associação Atlética Internacional (Limeira) managers
Nacional Atlético Clube (SP) managers
Esporte Clube Paraguaçuense managers
Associação Ferroviária de Esportes managers
Oeste Futebol Clube managers
Rio Branco Sport Club managers
Uberlândia Esporte Clube managers
Vitória Futebol Clube (ES) managers
Grêmio de Esportes Maringá managers
Footballers from São Paulo (state)